Florencia is a Ropax ship of the Italian shipping company Grimaldi Lines that was put into service in 2003 under the name Golfo Aranci. It is used under charter by TTT Lines on the route from Naples to Catania and from Salerno to Messina.

Sister ships 
Below is the list of ships with their current names. The project class is highlighted next to the name.

 Venice (IMO 9304631)

 Sorrento (IMO 9264312)

 Catania (IMO 9261554)

References 

2003 ships
Ships built in Italy
Ferries of Italy